Mandayam Osuri Parthasarathy Iyengar (15 December 1886 – 10 December 1963) was a prominent Indian botanist and phycologist who researched the structure, cytology, reproduction and taxonomy of algae. He is known as the "father of  Indian phycology" or "father of algology in India". He was the first President of Phycological Society of India. He primarily studied the Volvocales.

Iyengar was born in Madras where his father M.O. Alasingrachariar worked as an attorney. The wealthy family was known for achievements in many walks of lives. After studies at the Hindu High School, he went to Presidency College, obtaining a BA degree in 1906 and an MA in 1909. He then became a curator in the Government Museum at Madras and became a lecturer in the Teacher's College in 1911. He became a professor of botany in the Presidency College in 1920 and worked on algae aside from teaching. He worked in the UK in 1930 along with Professor F.E. Fritsch at the Queen Mary College from where he received a PhD.

Iyengar was an active sportsman and swimmer. He rescued two of his students from drowning in the Pamban in 1925. He was also a billiards champion in Madras. He died from cerebral thrombosis.

Several taxa have been named after him including Iyengaria (Punctariaceae), Iyengarina (Dematiaceae), Iyengariella (Stigonemataceae), and Parthasarathiella (Stigonemataceae).

Selected research papers

References

External links 
 History of the Center of Advanced Studies in Botany, From the official website of the University of Madras 
 Website of the Indian Botanical Society

1886 births
1963 deaths
19th-century Indian botanists
Indian phycologists
20th-century Indian botanists
Fellows of the Linnean Society of London